Seishi (written: 聖史, 正士, 正史 or 誠志) is a masculine Japanese given name. Notable people with the name include:

 (born 1945), Japanese jurist
 (1902–1974), Japanese physicist
 (born 1974), Japanese manga artist
 (1902–1981), Japanese writer
-  (1871–1948), Japanese spiritual leader

See also
Mahasthamaprapta

Japanese masculine given names